Football Club Desna Pohreby is a Ukrainian football club based in Pohreby, Brovary District, Kyiv Region, founded in 2006. Performs in the Kyiv Oblast Football Federation and Kyiv Region Cup.

History 
The club was founded in 2006 in Pohreby, Brovary District, Kyiv Region, founded in 2006. Performs in the Kyiv Oblast Football Federation and Kyiv Region Cup. In 2016 he got into the final of the Kyiv Oblast Football Federation. In 2019, the team got 5th place in the Kyiv Oblast Football Federation.

Honours 
Kyiv Oblast Football Federation:
 Second Place 2016
 Third Place 2017

Kyiv Region Cup: 2017

Notable players

See also 
 FC Desna Chernihiv
 FC Desna-2 Chernihiv
 FC Desna-3 Chernihiv

References

External links 
Facebook
Instagram
Vkontakte
Video

2006 establishments in Ukraine
Association football clubs established in 2006
Football clubs in Kyiv
Football clubs in Kyiv Oblast